The Fantasie in C major, Op. 15 (D. 760), popularly known as the Wanderer Fantasy, is a four-movement fantasy for solo piano composed by Franz Schubert in 1822. It is widely considered Schubert's most technically demanding composition for the piano. Schubert himself said "the devil may play it," in reference to his own inability to do so properly.

Historical background 
Schubert composed this work in late 1822, just after breaking off work on the Unfinished Symphony while sketching its incomplete scherzo. It was written for and dedicated to Carl Emanuel Liebenberg von Zsittin, who had studied piano with Johann Nepomuk Hummel, in the hope of some remuneration from the dedication. It is not only a technically formidable challenge for the performer, but also a structurally formidable four-movement work combining theme-and-variations with sonata form. Each movement transitions into the next instead of ending with a final definitive cadence, and each starts with a variation of the opening phrase of his lied "Der Wanderer", D. 489. The second movement, marked "adagio," states the theme in virtually the same way it is presented in the song, whereas the three fast movements begin with variants in diminution (that is, shortened note values): the first movement, "allegro con fuoco ma non troppo," a monothematic sonata form in which the second theme is another variant, the third, "presto," a scherzo in triple meter, and the finale, marked simply "allegro," starting as a quasi-fugue and making increasing demands on the player's technical and interpretive powers as it storms on to its conclusion.

Structure 
The whole work is based on one single basic motif from which all themes are developed. This motif is distilled from the theme of the C-sharp minor second movement, which is a sequence of variations on a melody taken from the lied "Der Wanderer", which Schubert wrote in 1816. It is this set of variations from which the work's popular name is derived.

The four movements are played without a break. After the first movement Allegro con fuoco ma non troppo in C major and the second movement Adagio (which begins in C-sharp minor and ends in E major), follow a scherzo presto in A-flat major and the technically transcendental finale, which starts in fugato returning to the key of C major and becomes more and more virtuosic as it moves toward its thunderous nonfugal conclusion.

Liszt's transcriptions 
The Hungarian composer Franz Liszt, who was fascinated by the Wanderer Fantasy, transcribed it for piano and orchestra (S.366) and two pianos (S.653). He additionally edited the original score and added some various interpretations in ossia, and made a complete rearrangement of the final movement (S.565a).

References

External links 
 

Piano music by Franz Schubert
Compositions for solo piano
1822 compositions
Schubert
Compositions in C major
Music with dedications